The 1952 Western Michigan Broncos baseball team represented Michigan College of Education (now known Western Michigan University) in the 1952 NCAA baseball season. The Broncos played their home games at Hyames Field. The team was coached by Charlie Maher in his 14th year at Western Michigan.

The Broncos won the District IV playoff to advanced to the College World Series, where they were defeated by the Holy Cross Crusaders.

Roster

Schedule 

! style="" | Regular Season
|- valign="top" 

|- align="center" bgcolor="#ffcccc"
| 1 || April 11 || at  || Varsity Diamond • Columbus, Ohio || 2–4 || 0–1 || –
|- align="center" bgcolor="#ccffcc"
| 2 || April  || vs  || Unknown • Unknown || 8–2 || 1–1 || –
|- align="center" bgcolor="#ffcccc"
| 3 || April  || vs Marshall || Unknown • Unknown || 6–8 || 1–2 || –
|- align="center" bgcolor="#ccffcc"
| 4 || April  || vs  || Unknown • Unknown || 5–3 || 2–2 || 1–0
|- align="center" bgcolor="#ccffcc"
| 5 || April  || vs Ohio || Unknown • Unknown || 3–2 || 3–2 || 2–0
|- align="center" bgcolor="#ccffcc"
| 6 || April  || vs  || Unknown • Unknown || 15–2 || 4–2 || 3–0
|- align="center" bgcolor="#ccffcc"
| 7 || April  || vs Western Reserve || Unknown • Unknown || 3–1 || 5–2 || 4–0
|- align="center" bgcolor="#ccffcc"
| 8 || April  || vs  || Unknown • Unknown || 14–2 || 6–2 || 5–0
|- align="center" bgcolor="#ccffcc"
| 9 || April  || vs Kent State || Unknown • Unknown || 12–2 || 7–2 || 6–0
|-

|- align="center" bgcolor="#ccffcc"
| 10 || May 5 ||  || Hyames Field • Kalamazoo, Michigan || 4–0 || 8–2 || 6–0
|- align="center" bgcolor="#ccffcc"
| 11 || May  || vs  || Unknown • Unknown || 4–1 || 9–2 || 7–0
|- align="center" bgcolor="#ccffcc"
| 12 || May 15 || at Notre Dame || Unknown • Notre Dame, Indiana || 10–8 || 10–2 || 7–0
|- align="center" bgcolor="#ccffcc"
| 13 || May 16 || vs Naval Station Great Lakes || Unknown • Unknown || 9–7 || 11–2 || 7–0
|- align="center" bgcolor="#ccffcc"
| 14 || May 18 || vs  || Unknown • Unknown || 9–2 || 12–2 || 8–0
|- align="center" bgcolor="#ffcccc"
| 15 || May  || vs Naval Station Great Lakes || Unknown • Unknown || 5–7 || 12–3 || 8–0
|-

|- align="center" bgcolor="#ccffcc"
| 16 || June 6 ||  || Hyames Field • Kalamazoo, Michigan || 8–1 || 13–3 || 8–0
|- align="center" bgcolor="#ffcccc"
| 17 || June 7 || at Michigan State || Old College Field • East Lansing, Michigan || 2–11 || 13–4 || 8–0
|-

|-
|-
! style="" | Postseason
|- valign="top"

|- align="center" bgcolor="#ccffcc"
| 18 || June  || vs  || Illinois Field • Champaign, Illinois || 5–2 || 14–4 || 8–0
|- align="center" bgcolor="#ffcccc"
| 19 || June  || vs Wisconsin || Illinois Park • Champaign, Illinois || 4–5 || 14–5 || 8–0
|- align="center" bgcolor="#ccffcc"
| 20 || June  || vs Wisconsin || Illinois Park • Champaign, Illinois || 4–3 || 15–5 || 8–0
|- align="center" bgcolor="#ccffcc"
| 21 || June  || vs  || Illinois Park • Champaign, Illinois || 8–2 || 16–5 || 8–0
|- align="center" bgcolor="#ccffcc"
| 22 || June  || vs Illinois || Illinois Park • Champaign, Illinois || 1–0 || 17–5 || 8–0
|-

|- align="center" bgcolor="#ffcccc"
| 23 || June 12 || vs Holy Cross || Omaha Municipal Stadium • Omaha, Nebraska || 1–5 || 17–6 || 8–0
|- align="center" bgcolor="#ccffcc"
| 24 || June 13 || vs Colorado State || Omaha Municipal Stadium • Omaha, Nebraska || 8–6 || 18–6 || 8–0
|- align="center" bgcolor="#ccffcc"
| 25 || June 14 || vs Duke || Omaha Municipal Stadium • Omaha, Nebraska || 5–1 || 19–6 || 8–0
|- align="center" bgcolor="#ffcccc"
| 26 || June 15 || vs Holy Cross || Omaha Municipal Stadium • Omaha, Nebraska || 3–15 || 19–7 || 8–0
|-

Awards and honors 
Jack Baldwin
 Second Team All-MAC

Tom Cole
 First Team All-MAC

Dave Gottschalk
 First Team All-MAC

Bill Hayes
 First Team All-MAC

Len Johnston
 First Team All-MAC

Bob Urda
 Second Team All-MAC

References 

Western Michigan Broncos baseball seasons
Western Michigan Broncos baseball
College World Series seasons
Western Michigan
Mid-American Conference baseball champion seasons